Dengue fever is an endemic viral infectious disease.

Dengue fever may also refer to:
 Dengue virus, the virus that causes dengue fever
 Dengue Fever (band)

See also
 Dengue fever outbreaks